Rahn+Bodmer Co. is a Swiss private bank specialized in investment advisory and asset management. The company was founded in Zurich in 1750 as a silk trading house and today is the oldest private bank in Zurich. Its form is a limited partnership now with 5 liable partners. For several generations, the company is owned by the Zurich families Rahn, Bodmer and Bidermann.

References 
Article contains translated text from Rahn+Bodmer on the German Wikipedia retrieved on 12 March 2017.

External links 

Homepage

Banks based in Zürich
Banks established in 1750
18th-century establishments in Switzerland